The 1999 San Francisco Giants season was the Giants' 117th season in Major League Baseball, their 42nd season in San Francisco since their move from New York following the 1957 season, and their 40th and final season at 3Com Park at Candlestick Point. The team finished in second place in the National League West with an 86–76 record, 14  games behind the Arizona Diamondbacks.

Offseason
November 10, 1998: Dante Powell was traded by the San Francisco Giants to the Arizona Diamondbacks for Alan Embree.
January 15, 1999: Jalal Leach was signed as a free agent with the San Francisco Giants.

Regular season

Opening Day starters
Rich Aurilia
Marvin Benard
Barry Bonds
Ellis Burks
Mark Gardner
Jeff Kent
Brent Mayne
Bill Mueller
J. T. Snow

Season standings

Record vs. opponents

Notable transactions
 April 27, 1999: Felipe Crespo was signed as a free agent with the San Francisco Giants.

Roster

Batting
Note: Pos = Position; G = Games played; AB = At bats; H = Hits; Avg. = Batting average; HR = Home runs; RBI = Runs batted in

Other batters
Note: G = Games played; AB = At bats; H = Hits; Avg. = Batting average; HR = Home runs; RBI = Runs batted in

Starting pitchers
Note: G = Games pitched; IP = Innings pitched; W = Wins; L = Losses; ERA = Earned run average; SO = Strikeouts

Other pitchers
Note: G = Games pitched; IP = Innings pitched; W = Wins; L = Losses; ERA = Earned run average; SO = Strikeouts

Relief pitchers
Note: G = Games pitched; W = Wins; L = Losses; SV = Saves; ERA = Earned run average; SO = Strikeouts

Award winners
 Marvin Benard CF, Willie Mac Award
All-Star Game

Farm system

References

External links
 1999 San Francisco Giants at Baseball Reference
 1999 San Francisco Giants at Baseball Almanac

San Francisco Giants seasons
San Francisco Giants Season, 1999
San Francisco Giants Season, 1999
1999 in San Francisco
San Fran